Funda İyce Tuncel (born in 1968, Ankara) is a Turkish painter and founding member of the Contemporary Arts Foundation.

She was born in Ankara, Turkey in 1968. She received education in Gazi University in the Art Department. From 1992 to 1995, she worked as an art consultant at the Atatürk Cultural Center.

She became a member of several organizations including "The International Fine Arts Society" (UPSD), "Pan-Mediterranean Women Artists Network" (FAM), and the "United Painters and Sculptors Society" (BRHD),  of which she was the Secretary-General from 1998 to 2002. She was also the founder and first member of the "Contemporary Arts Foundation" (ÇAĞSAV). She was also a founding member of the "International Knidos Culture and Arts Academy" (UKKSA).

In 2008 she published her first book detailing her methods and artwork, and a second book, Göç İmgeleri, in 2013.

She has had 44 personal expositions at several places including one at the Grand National Assembly, and also many collaborative exhibitions.

References

Living people
1968 births
People from Ankara
Gazi University alumni
Turkish women painters
Turkish artists
21st-century women artists